The 1893 Northwestern Purple team represented Northwestern University during the 1893 college football season. In their first and only year under head coach Paul Noyes, the Purple compiled a 2–5–3 record.

Schedule

References

Northwestern
Northwestern Wildcats football seasons
Northwestern Purple football